The Boleyn family was a prominent English family in the gentry and aristocracy. They reached the peak of their influence during the Tudor period, when Anne Boleyn became the second wife and queen consort of Henry VIII, their daughter being the future Elizabeth I.

John Boleyn of Salle in Norfolk first appears on the register of Walsingham Abbey. There is possibility that this John Boleyn had a father called Simon de Boleyne who bought lands in the same village of Salle in Norfolk in 1252.

Due to the irregularity of English spelling at this period, the name in documents is also spelled Bulleyn or Bullen. It has been suggested that the surname “Boleyn” was originally pronounced as Boulogne, owing the idea of a French origin for the family. 

Queen Elizabeth the Queen Mother, Queen Elizabeth II, and King Charles III are descendants of Mary Boleyn.

Hever Castle in Kent was the family seat of the Boleyns and the childhood home of Queen Consort Anne Boleyn.  Sir Geoffrey Boleyn bought Hever Castle in 1462 and Blickling Hall in Norfolk in 1452. The Boleyns lived off the profits of the estates, only visiting them occasionally, but Hever Castle was home when they were not at court or on the king’s missions.

Notable members
Members of the family include:
Sir Geoffrey Boleyn, a mercer and Lord Mayor of London, father of William
Thomas Boleyn, brother of Geoffrey, a priest and Master of Gonville Hall, Cambridge
Sir William Boleyn, a mercer and father of Anne, Thomas and James
Lady Margaret Boleyn, née Butler, wife of William, mother of Anne, Thomas and James
Anne Shelton, née Boleyn, sister of Thomas and James, mother of Margaret (Madge) Shelton, a mistress of Henry VIII
Thomas Boleyn, 1st Earl of Wiltshire and 1st Earl of Ormond, father of Mary, Anne and George, courtier and diplomat
Elizabeth Boleyn, Countess of Wiltshire, née Howard, wife of Thomas and a lady-in-waiting, mother of Mary, Anne and George
Mary Boleyn, sister of Anne, a mistress of Henry VIII
George Boleyn, Viscount Rochford, brother of Anne, courtier and diplomat
Anne Boleyn, Queen of England previously Marquess of Pembroke, the second wife of Henry VIII and mother of Queen Elizabeth I
Jane Boleyn, Viscountess Rochford, née Parker, wife of George and a lady-in-waiting
Sir James Boleyn, brother of Anne and Thomas, courtier and chancellor of the household of his niece, Anne
Lady Elizabeth Boleyn, née Wood, wife of James and a lady-in-waiting
George Boleyn, dean of Lichfield, probably a distant cousin but allegedly the son of George and Jane

Further reading
Julia Fox, Jane Boleyn: The Infamous Lady Rochford
Eric Ives, The Life and Death of Anne Boleyn
Elizabeth Norton, The Boleyn Women
Amanda Harvey Purse, The Boleyns: From the Tudors to the Windsors

Boleyn Family tree

References

 
English gentry families